David Salles is a French actor and director.  He was born 28 April 1970 in Maisons-Alfort, Val-de-Marne, France.

Career

Awards

Filmography

References

External links
 official website
 

 1970 births
21st-century French male actors
Living people